Thomas F. Calabro (born February 3, 1959) is an American actor and director.

Biography
Calabro graduated from Fordham University in New York City.

Calabro began his acting career in theatre with various roles in New York. His first role was as Oberon in William Shakespeare's A Midsummer Night's Dream. In 1990, Calabro became a member of the Actors Studio and the Circle Repertory Company, along with fellow actor Denzel Washington.

Calabro's most notable role was playing Dr. Michael Mancini on Melrose Place. He was the only cast member to stay on the show throughout its entire run from 1992 until 1999. After Melrose Place, Calabro had recurring roles on CBS' Without a Trace and Touched by an Angel, and on F/X's Nip/Tuck. Calabro had a recurring role on ABC Family's Greek as Rebecca Logan's father, ex-Senator Ken Logan.

In April 2009, People Magazine announced that Calabro would star in the 2009 series Melrose Place, a continuation of the original show, to be aired on The CW. He also appeared in Locker 13 in 2009. Calabro guest starred on an episode of Castle. He played Scott Donner, a man who is suspected of murder.

Personal life
Calabro has three children with his former wife, Elizabeth Pryor.

Filmography

External links
Thomas Calabro's official website

References

1959 births
Male actors from New York City
American male television actors
American television directors
Fordham University alumni
Living people